Joseph Ebenezer Graves (February 26, 1906 – December 22, 1980) was a third baseman in Major League Baseball. He played for the Chicago Cubs in 1926.

References

External links

1906 births
1980 deaths
Major League Baseball third basemen
Chicago Cubs players
Baseball players from Massachusetts
People from Marblehead, Massachusetts
Sportspeople from Essex County, Massachusetts